This list includes both authors whose entire literary production was officially banned in Nazi Germany and authors who were only partially banned. These authors are from the prohibitions lists in Nazi Germany and come from the following lists and others:
 List of damaging and undesirable writing, Liste des schädlichen und unerwünschten Schrifttums, December 31, 1938
 Jahreslisten 1939-1941. Unchanged new printing of the Leipzig edition, 1938-1941, Vaduz 1979

The official list was published by the Reichsministerium für Volksaufklärung und Propaganda. Authors, living and dead, were placed on the list because of Jewish descent, or because of pacifist or communist and/or Freemasonic sympathies or suspicion thereof. 

In May and June 1933, in the first year of the Nazi government, there were book burnings. These book bans compose a part of the history of censorship and a subset of the list of banned books.

After World War II started, Germans created indexes of prohibited books in countries they occupied, of works in languages other than German. For example, in occupied Poland, an index of 1,500 prohibited authors was created.

A 
 Alfred Adler
 Hermann Adler
 Max Adler
 Raoul Auernheimer

B 

 Otto Bauer
 Vicki Baum
 Johannes R. Becher
 Richard Beer-Hofmann
 Hilaire Belloc
 Walter Benjamin
 Robert Hugh Benson
 Walter A. Berendsohn
 Ernst Bloch
 Felix Braun
 Bertolt Brecht
 Willi Bredel
 Hermann Broch
 Ferdinand Bruckner
 Edmund Burke

C 
 G. K. Chesterton

D 
 Dorothy Day
 Ludwig Dexheimer
 Alfred Döblin
 John Dos Passos

E 

 Albert Ehrenstein
 Albert Einstein
 Carl Einstein
 Friedrich Engels
 Erasmus

F 

 Lion Feuchtwanger
 F. Scott Fitzgerald
 Marieluise Fleißer
 Leonhard Frank
 Anna Freud
 Sigmund Freud
 Egon Friedell

G 
 Edward Gibbon
 André Gide
 Ernst Glaeser
 William Godwin
 Emma Goldman
 Claire Goll
 Oskar Maria Graf
 George Grosz

H 

 Ernst Haeckel
 Radclyffe Hall
 Jaroslav Hašek
 Walter Hasenclever
 Raoul Hausmann
 Heinrich Heine
 Ernest Hemingway
 Theodor Herzl
 Hermann Hesse
 Magnus Hirschfeld
 J. Edgar Hoover
 Jakob van Hoddis
 Ödön von Horvath
 Karl Hubbuch
 David Hume
 Aldous Huxley

I 
Vera Inber

J 
 Hans Henny Jahnn
 Thomas Jefferson
 Georg Jellinek

K 

 Franz Kafka
 Georg Kaiser
 Mascha Kaleko
 Hermann Kantorowicz
 Erich Kästner
 Karl Kautsky
 Hans Kelsen
 Alfred Kerr
 Irmgard Keun
 John Maynard Keynes
 Klabund
 Heinrich Kley
 Annette Kolb
 Paul Kornfeld
 Siegfried Kracauer
 Karl Kraus
 Peter Kropotkin
 Adam Kuckhoff

L 

 Else Lasker-Schüler
 Vladimir Lenin
 C. S. Lewis
 Karl Liebknecht
 Jack London
 Ernst Lothar
 Emil Ludwig
 Rosa Luxemburg

M 

 Joseph de Maistre
 André Malraux
 Heinrich Mann
 Klaus Mann
 Thomas Mann
 Mao Zedong
 Hans Marchwitza
 Ludwig Marcuse
 Karl Marx
 Vladimir Mayakovsky
 Walter Mehring
 Thomas Merton
 E.C. Albrecht Meyenberg
 Gustav Meyrink
 Ludwig von Mises
 Thomas More
 Erich Mühsam
 Robert Musil

N 
 Alfred Neumann
 Robert Neumann
 John Henry Newman

O 

 Flannery O'Connor
 George Orwell
 Carl von Ossietzky
 Ouida

P 

 Thomas Paine
 Hertha Pauli
 Adelheid Popp
 Marcel Proust

R 

 Fritz Reck-Malleczewen
 Gustav Regler
 Wilhelm Reich
 Erich Maria Remarque
 Karl Renner
 Joachim Ringelnatz
 Joseph Roth
 Jean-Jacques Rousseau

S 

 Nelly Sachs
 Felix Salten
 Rahel Sanzara
 Arthur Schnitzler
 Alvin Schwartz
 Anna Seghers
 Walter Serner
 Fulton Sheen
 Ignazio Silone
 Adam Smith
 Joseph Stalin
 Rudolf Steiner
 Carl Sternheim

T 
 J.R.R. Tolkien
 Ernst Toller
 Friedrich Torberg
 B. Traven
 Leon Trotsky
 Kurt Tucholsky
 Mark Twain

V 
 Voltaire

W 

 Jakob Wassermann
 Armin T. Wegner
 Simone Weil
 H. G. Wells
 Franz Werfel
 Oscar Wilde
 Eugen Gottlob Winkler
 Friedrich Wolf

Z 
 Carl Zuckmayer
 Arnold Zweig
 Stefan Zweig

See also 
 List of books banned by governments

References

External links 
 List of books banned by the Nazis, from the website Berlin.de
 List of authors banned by the Nazis, from the website verbrannte-und-verbannte.de

Banned Third Reich
Nazi culture
Book censorship
Nazi-related lists
Blacklisting
Lists of prohibited books